The Henhouse Prowlers are an American male four-piece combo who play and promote Bluegrass music. They call themselves "Ambassadors of Bluegrass" and make efforts to promote bluegrass music and other world music (such as African music). They run educational music workshops, claiming, "Our Mission is to educate and inspire through the cultural exchange of music".

Personnel
 Ben Wright - banjo & vocals 
 Jake Howard - mandolin & vocals
 Chris Dollar - guitar & vocals
 Jon Goldfine - double bass & vocals

Discography
 Henhouse Prowlers 2007
 Still On That Ride
 Dark Rumor Country 2009
 Verses Chapters & Rhymes 2011
 Breaking Ground 2013
 Separation Man  2017
 Live From Kyrgyzstan 2017
 The Departure 2020

References

 
American folk music
Country music genres
Old-time music